Namhae of Silla (?–24, r. 4–24 CE) was the second King of Silla, one of the Three Kingdoms of Korea. He is commonly called Namhae Chachaung, chachaung being an early Silla title.

Namhae is the only king who is called Chachaung. According to the Samguk Sagi, Kim Dae-Mun explained that the title "Chachaung" meant a shaman in Old Korean.

Background
He was the eldest son of Park Hyeokgeose, Silla's founder, and Lady Aryeong. His surname was Park, and his wife was Lady Unje (Hangul:운제 Hanja:雲帝).

Reign
His reign was characterized by a series of foreign invasions. In 4, the Lelang army surrounded Geumseong, the Sillan capital, but was repelled.

In 8, when the Namhae of Silla heard that Talhae was benevolent, he married his eldest daughter to him.

The Wa of Japan invaded Silla in 14, and while Silla stopped them, Lelang invaded again. A comet shower was said to have scared the Lelang soldiers, however, and they retreated.

The Bukmyeong(北溟) people plowed the fields and got Royal Seal of Ye(Hangul:예왕지인, Hanja:濊王之印), previously used by Buyeo's kings, and dedicated it to Silla in 19. It is not clear where Bukmyeong means.

He was buried in Sareung-won.

Family
Parents
Father: Hyeokgeose
Grandmother: Lady Saso
Mother: Lady Aryeong
Grandmother: Lady Saso
Younger sister:  Lady Aro
Consort and their respective issue:
 Lady Unje  (알영부인)
Son: Ilji Galmulwang (일지 갈문왕)
Son: Yuri of Silla (?–57, r. 24–57), formally known as Yuri Isageum was the third king of Silla
Son: Unknown name
Daughter: Queen Ahyo (아효부인 박씨)–became the wife of Talhae of Silla

Family tree

See also
 History of Korea
 List of Korean monarchs

References
The Academy of Korean Studies
Korea Britannica

References

Notes 

Silla rulers
24 deaths
1st-century monarchs in Asia
Year of birth unknown
1st-century Korean people